Uranium (92U) is a naturally occurring radioactive element that has no stable isotope. It has two primordial isotopes, uranium-238 and uranium-235, that have long half-lives and are found in appreciable quantity in the Earth's crust. The decay product uranium-234 is also found. Other isotopes such as uranium-233 have been produced in breeder reactors. In addition to isotopes found in nature or nuclear reactors, many isotopes with far shorter half-lives have been produced, ranging from 214U to 242U (with the exceptions of 220U and 241U).

Naturally occurring uranium is composed of three major isotopes, uranium-238 (99.2739–99.2752% natural abundance), uranium-235 (0.7198–0.7202%), and uranium-234 (0.0050–0.0059%).

Uranium-238 is an alpha emitter, decaying through the 18-member uranium series into lead-206. The decay series of uranium-235 (historically called actino-uranium) has 15 members and ends in lead-207. The constant rates of decay in these series makes comparison of the ratios of parent-to-daughter elements useful in radiometric dating. Uranium-233 is made from thorium-232 by neutron bombardment.

Uranium-235 is important for both nuclear reactors (energy production) and nuclear weapons because it is the only isotope existing in nature to any appreciable extent that is fissile in response to thermal neutrons, i.e., thermal neutron capture has a high probability of inducing fission. A chain reaction can be sustained with a sufficiently large (critical) mass of uranium-235. Uranium-238 is also important because it is fertile: it absorbs neutrons to produce a radioactive isotope that subsequently decays to the isotope plutonium-239, which also is fissile.

List of isotopes

|-
| 214U
|
| style="text-align:right" | 92
| style="text-align:right" | 122
| 
| 0.52(+0.95−0.21) ms
| α
| 210Th
| 0+
|
|
|-
| 215U
|
| style="text-align:right" | 92
| style="text-align:right" | 123
| 215.026760(90)
| 1.4(0.9) ms
| α
| 211Th
| 5/2−#
|
|
|-
| 216U
|
| style="text-align:right" | 92
| style="text-align:right" | 124
| 216.024760(30)
| 6.9(2.9) ms
| α
| 212Th
| 0+
|
|
|-
| style="text-indent:1em" | 216mU
|
| colspan="3" style="text-indent:2em" | 
| 1.4(0.9) ms
|
|
| 8+
|
|
|-
| 217U
|
| style="text-align:right" | 92
| style="text-align:right" | 125
| 217.02437(9)
| 0.85(0.71) ms
| α
| 213Th
| 1/2−#
|
|
|-
| 218U
|
| style="text-align:right" | 92
| style="text-align:right" | 126
| 218.02354(3)
| 0.35(0.09) ms
| α
| 214Th
| 0+
|
|
|-
| 219U
|
| style="text-align:right" | 92
| style="text-align:right" | 127
| 219.02492(6)
| 60(7) μs
| α
| 215Th
| 9/2+#
|
|

|-
| 221U
| 
| style="text-align:right" | 92
| style="text-align:right" | 129
| 221.02640(11)#
| 0.66(14) μs
| α
| 217Th
| (9/2+)
| 
| 
|-
| rowspan=2|222U
| rowspan=2|
| rowspan=2 style="text-align:right" | 92
| rowspan=2 style="text-align:right" | 130
| rowspan=2|222.02609(11)#
| rowspan=2|4.7(0.7) μs
| α
| 218Th
| rowspan=2|0+
| rowspan=2|
| rowspan=2|
|-
| β+ (10−6%)
| 222Pa
|-
| 223U
|
| style="text-align:right" | 92
| style="text-align:right" | 131
| 223.02774(8)
| 65(12) μs
| α
| 219Th
| 7/2+#
|
|
|-
| 224U
|
| style="text-align:right" | 92
| style="text-align:right" | 132
| 224.027605(27)
| 396(17) μs
| α
| 220Th
| 0+
|
|
|-
| 225U
|
| style="text-align:right" | 92
| style="text-align:right" | 133
| 225.02939#
| 62(4) ms
| α
| 221Th
| (5/2+)#
|
|
|-
| 226U
|
| style="text-align:right" | 92
| style="text-align:right" | 134
| 226.029339(14)
| 269(6) ms
| α
| 222Th
| 0+
|
|
|-
| rowspan=2|227U
| rowspan=2|
| rowspan=2 style="text-align:right" | 92
| rowspan=2 style="text-align:right" | 135
| rowspan=2|227.031156(18)
| rowspan=2|1.1(0.1) min
| α
| 223Th
| rowspan=2|(3/2+)
| rowspan=2|
| rowspan=2|
|-
| β+ (.001%)
| 227Pa
|-
| rowspan=2|228U
| rowspan=2|
| rowspan=2 style="text-align:right" | 92
| rowspan=2 style="text-align:right" | 136
| rowspan=2|228.031374(16)
| rowspan=2|9.1(0.2) min
| α (95%)
| 224Th
| rowspan=2|0+
| rowspan=2|
| rowspan=2|
|-
| EC (5%)
| 228Pa
|-
| rowspan=2|229U
| rowspan=2|
| rowspan=2 style="text-align:right" | 92
| rowspan=2 style="text-align:right" | 137
| rowspan=2|229.033506(6)
| rowspan=2|57.8(0.5) min
| β+ (80%)
| 229Pa
| rowspan=2|(3/2+)
| rowspan=2|
| rowspan=2|
|-
| α (20%)
| 225Th
|-
| rowspan=3|230U
| rowspan=3|
| rowspan=3 style="text-align:right" | 92
| rowspan=3 style="text-align:right" | 138
| rowspan=3|230.033940(5)
| rowspan=3|20.23(0.02) d
| α
| 226Th
| rowspan=3|0+
| rowspan=3|
| rowspan=3|
|-
| SF (1.4×10−10%)
| (various)
|-
| β+β+ (rare)
| 230Th
|-
| rowspan=2|231U
| rowspan=2|
| rowspan=2 style="text-align:right" | 92
| rowspan=2 style="text-align:right" | 139
| rowspan=2|231.036294(3)
| rowspan=2|4.2(0.1) d
| EC
| 231Pa
| rowspan=2|(5/2)(+#)
| rowspan=2|
| rowspan=2|
|-
| α (.004%)
| 227Th
|-
| rowspan=4|232U
| rowspan=4|
| rowspan=4 style="text-align:right" | 92
| rowspan=4 style="text-align:right" | 140
| rowspan=4|232.0371562(24)
| rowspan=4|68.9(0.4) y
| α
| 228Th
| rowspan=4|0+
| rowspan=4|
| rowspan=4|
|-
| CD (8.9×10−10%)
| 208Pb24Ne
|-
| CD (5×10−12%)
| 204Hg28Mg
|-
| SF (10−12%)
| (various)
|-
| rowspan=4|233U
| rowspan=4|
| rowspan=4 style="text-align:right" | 92
| rowspan=4 style="text-align:right" | 141
| rowspan=4|233.0396352(29)
| rowspan=4|1.592(2)×105 y
| α
| 229Th
| rowspan=4|5/2+
| rowspan=4|Trace
| rowspan=4|
|-
| SF (6×10−9%)
| (various)
|-
| CD (7.2×10−11%)
| 209Pb24Ne
|-
| CD (1.3×10−13%)
| 205Hg28Mg
|-
| rowspan=4|234U
| rowspan=4|Uranium II
| rowspan=4 style="text-align:right" | 92
| rowspan=4 style="text-align:right" | 142
| rowspan=4|234.0409521(20)
| rowspan=4|2.455(6)×105 y
| α
| 230Th
| rowspan=4|0+
| rowspan=4|[0.000054(5)]
| rowspan=4|0.000050–0.000059
|-
| SF (1.73×10−9%)
| (various)
|-
| CD (1.4×10−11%)
| 206Hg28Mg
|-
| CD (9×10−12%)
| 184Hf26Ne24Ne
|-
| style="text-indent:1em" | 234mU
|
| colspan="3" style="text-indent:2em" | 1421.32(10) keV
| 33.5(2.0) ms
|
|
| 6−
|
|
|-
| rowspan=3|235U
| rowspan=3|Actin UraniumActino-Uranium
| rowspan=3 style="text-align:right" | 92
| rowspan=3 style="text-align:right" | 143
| rowspan=3|235.0439299(20)
| rowspan=3|7.038(1)×108 y
| α
| 231Th
| rowspan=3|7/2−
| rowspan=3|[0.007204(6)]
| rowspan=3|0.007198–0.007207
|-
| SF (7×10−9%)
| (various)
|-
| CD (8×10−10%)
| 186Hf25Ne24Ne
|-
| style="text-indent:1em" | 235mU
|
| colspan="3" style="text-indent:2em" | 0.0765(4) keV
| ~26 min
| IT
| 235U
| 1/2+
|
|
|-
| rowspan=2|236U
| rowspan=2|Thoruranium
| rowspan=2 style="text-align:right" | 92
| rowspan=2 style="text-align:right" | 144
| rowspan=2|236.045568
| rowspan=2|2.342(3)×107 y
| α
| 232Th
| rowspan=2|0+
| rowspan=2|Trace
| rowspan=2|
|-
| SF (9.6×10−8%)
| (various)
|-
| style="text-indent:1em" | 236m1U
|
| colspan="3" style="text-indent:2em" | 1052.89(19) keV
| 100(4) ns
|
|
| (4)−
|
|
|-
| style="text-indent:1em" | 236m2U
|
| colspan="3" style="text-indent:2em" | 2750(10) keV
| 120(2) ns
|
|
| (0+)
|
|
|-
| 237U
|
| style="text-align:right" | 92
| style="text-align:right" | 145
| 237.0487302(20)
| 6.752(0.002) d
| β−
| 237Np
| 1/2+
| Trace
|
|-
| rowspan=3|238U
| rowspan=3|Uranium I
| rowspan=3 style="text-align:right" | 92
| rowspan=3 style="text-align:right" | 146
| rowspan=3|238.0507882(20)
| rowspan=3|4.468(3)×109 y
| α
| 234Th
| rowspan=3|0+
| rowspan=3|[0.992742(10)]
| rowspan=3|0.992739–0.992752
|-
| SF (5.45×10−5%)
| (various)
|-
| β−β− (2.19×10−10%)
| 238Pu
|-
| style="text-indent:1em" | 238mU
|
| colspan="3" style="text-indent:2em" | 2557.9(5) keV
| 280(6) ns
|
|
| 0+
|
|
|-
| 239U
|
| style="text-align:right" | 92
| style="text-align:right" | 147
| 239.0542933(21)
| 23.45(0.02) min
| β−
| 239Np
| 5/2+
|
|
|-
| style="text-indent:1em" | 239m1U
|
| colspan="3" style="text-indent:2em" | 20(20)# keV
| >250 ns
|
|
| (5/2+)
|
|
|-
| style="text-indent:1em" | 239m2U
|
| colspan="3" style="text-indent:2em" | 133.7990(10) keV
| 780(40) ns
|
|
| 1/2+
|
|
|-
| rowspan=2|240U
| rowspan=2|
| rowspan=2 style="text-align:right" | 92
| rowspan=2 style="text-align:right" | 148
| rowspan=2|240.056592(6)
| rowspan=2|14.1(0.1) h
| β−
| 240Np
| rowspan=2|0+
| rowspan=2|Trace
| rowspan=2|
|-
| α (10−10%)
| 236Th

|-
| 242U
|
| style="text-align:right" | 92
| style="text-align:right" | 150
| 242.06293(22)#
| 16.8(0.5) min
| β−
| 242Np
| 0+
|
|

Actinides vs fission products

Uranium-214

Uranium-214 is the lightest known isotope of uranium. It was discovered in 2021 at the Spectrometer for Heavy Atoms and Nuclear Structure (SHANS) at the Heavy Ion Research Facility in Lanzhou, China in 2021, produced by firing argon-36 at tungsten-182.

Uranium-232

Uranium-232 has a half-life of 68.9 years and is a side product in the thorium cycle. It has been cited as an obstacle to nuclear proliferation using 233U as the fissile material, because the intense gamma radiation emitted by 208Tl (a daughter of 232U, produced relatively quickly) makes the 233U contaminated with it more difficult to handle. Uranium-232 is a rare example of an even-even isotope that is fissile with both thermal and fast neutrons.

Uranium-233

Uranium-233 is a fissile isotope of uranium that is bred from thorium-232 as part of the thorium fuel cycle. Uranium-233 was investigated for use in nuclear weapons and as a reactor fuel. It was occasionally tested but never deployed in nuclear weapons and has not been used commercially as a nuclear fuel. It has been used successfully in experimental nuclear reactors and has been proposed for much wider use as a nuclear fuel. It has a half-life of around 160,000 years.

Uranium-233 is produced by the neutron irradiation of thorium-232. When thorium-232 absorbs a neutron, it becomes thorium-233, which has a half-life of only 22 minutes. Thorium-233 decays into protactinium-233 through beta decay. Protactinium-233 has a half-life of 27 days and beta decays into uranium-233; some proposed molten salt reactor designs attempt to physically isolate the protactinium from further neutron capture before beta decay can occur.

Uranium-233 usually fissions on neutron absorption but sometimes retains the neutron, becoming uranium-234. The capture-to-fission ratio is smaller than the other two major fissile fuels uranium-235 and plutonium-239; it is also lower than that of short-lived plutonium-241, but bested by very difficult-to-produce neptunium-236.

Uranium-234

Uranium-234 is an isotope of uranium. In natural uranium and in uranium ore, 234U occurs as an indirect decay product of uranium-238, but it makes up only 0.0055% (55 parts per million) of the raw uranium because its half-life of just 245,500 years is only about 1/18,000 as long as that of 238U. The path of production of 234U via nuclear decay is as follows: 238U nuclei emit an alpha particle to become thorium-234. Next, with a short half-life, a 234Th nucleus emits a beta particle to become protactinium-234. Finally, 234Pa nuclei each emit another beta particle to become 234U nuclei.

234U nuclei usually last for hundreds of thousands of years, but then they decay by alpha emission to thorium-230, except for the small percentage of nuclei that undergo spontaneous fission.

Extraction of rather small amounts of 234U from natural uranium would be feasible using isotope separation, similar to that used for regular uranium-enrichment. However, there is no real demand in chemistry, physics, or engineering for isolating 234U. Very small pure samples of 234U can be extracted via the chemical ion-exchange process—from samples of plutonium-238 that have been aged somewhat to allow some decay to 234U via alpha emission.

Enriched uranium contains more 234U than natural uranium as a byproduct of the uranium enrichment process aimed at obtaining uranium-235, which concentrates lighter isotopes even more strongly than it does 235U. The increased percentage of 234U in enriched natural uranium is acceptable in current nuclear reactors, but (re-enriched) reprocessed uranium might contain even higher fractions of 234U, which is undesirable. This is because 234U is not fissile, and tends to absorb slow neutrons in a nuclear reactor—becoming 235U.

234U has a neutron capture cross section of about 100 barns for thermal neutrons, and about 700 barns for its resonance integral—the average over neutrons having various intermediate energies. In a nuclear reactor, non-fissile isotopes capture a neutron breeding fissile isotopes. 234U is converted to 235U more easily and therefore at a greater rate than uranium-238 is to plutonium-239 (via neptunium-239), because 238U has a much smaller neutron-capture cross section of just 2.7 barns.

Uranium-235

Uranium-235 is an isotope of uranium making up about 0.72% of natural uranium. Unlike the predominant isotope uranium-238, it is fissile, i.e., it can sustain a fission chain reaction. It is the only fissile isotope that is a primordial nuclide or found in significant quantity in nature.

Uranium-235 has a half-life of 703.8 million years. It was discovered in 1935 by Arthur Jeffrey Dempster. Its (fission) nuclear cross section for slow thermal neutron is about 504.81 barns. For fast neutrons it is on the order of 1 barn. At thermal energy levels, about 5 of 6 neutron absorptions result in fission and 1 of 6 result in neutron capture forming uranium-236. The fission-to-capture ratio improves for faster neutrons.

Uranium-236

Uranium-236 is an isotope of uranium with a half-life of about 23 million years that is neither fissile with thermal neutrons, nor very good fertile material, but is generally considered a nuisance and long-lived radioactive waste. It is found in spent nuclear fuel and in the reprocessed uranium made from spent nuclear fuel.

Uranium-237
Uranium-237 is an isotope of uranium. It has a half life of about 6.75(1) days. It decays into neptunium-237 by beta decay.

Uranium-238

Uranium-238 (238U or U-238) is the most common isotope of uranium found in nature. It is not fissile, but is a fertile material: it can capture a slow neutron and after two beta decays become fissile plutonium-239. Uranium-238 is fissionable by fast neutrons, but cannot support a chain reaction because inelastic scattering reduces neutron energy below the range where fast fission of one or more next-generation nuclei is probable. Doppler broadening of 238U's neutron absorption resonances, increasing absorption as fuel temperature increases, is also an essential negative feedback mechanism for reactor control.

Around 99.284% of natural uranium is uranium-238, which has a half-life of 1.41×1017 seconds (4.468×109 years, or 4.468 billion years). Depleted uranium has an even higher concentration of the 238U isotope, and even low-enriched uranium (LEU), while having a higher proportion of the uranium-235 isotope (in comparison to depleted uranium), is still mostly 238U. Reprocessed uranium is also mainly 238U, with about as much uranium-235 as natural uranium, a comparable proportion of uranium-236, and much smaller amounts of other isotopes of uranium such as uranium-234, uranium-233, and uranium-232.

Uranium-239

Uranium-239 is an isotope of uranium. It is usually produced by exposing 238U to neutron radiation in a nuclear reactor. 239U has a half-life of about 23.45 minutes and decays into neptunium-239 through beta decay, with a total decay energy of about 1.29 MeV. The most common gamma decay at 74.660 keV accounts for the difference in the two major channels of beta emission energy, at 1.28 and 1.21 MeV.

239Np further decays to plutonium-239 also through beta decay (239Np has a half-life of about 2.356 days), in a second important step that ultimately produces fissile 239Pu (used in weapons and for nuclear power), from 238U in reactors.

References

 
Uranium
Uranium